Alfred Barrett (died 18 July 1849) was born in New England. He was an engineer by training.

In about 1818, Barrett began working on the engineering staff that was constructing the Erie Canal in New York State. He rapidly gained experience and was an accredited engineer by 1821. The project was completed in 1825.

In 1824, the Erie project was visited by William Hamilton Merritt and he likely recruited Barrett as resident superintending engineer of the Welland Canal. Over the course of his career, he worked on a variety of important projects including the Lachine Canal improvements and resident engineer on the Erie.

His professional achievements were of high importance to the development of the economy of this North American area. His early death cut short a highly productive and important engineering career.

He died in Montreal of cholera.

External links 
 Biography at the Dictionary of Canadian Biography Online

Canadian engineers
1849 deaths
American canal engineers
Year of birth unknown
Erie Canal
Welland Canal